Førre or Førresfjorden is a village in Tysvær municipality in Rogaland county, Norway. The village is located at the northern end of the Førresfjorden.

The village sits along the European route E134 highway connecting it to the nearby city of Haugesund to the west and to the villages of Aksdal and Grinde to the east. Førre Church is located in this village.

References

Villages in Rogaland
Tysvær